A partial solar eclipse will occur on Monday, December 16, 2047. A solar eclipse occurs when the Moon passes between Earth and the Sun, thereby totally or partly obscuring the image of the Sun for a viewer on Earth. A partial solar eclipse occurs in the polar regions of the Earth when the center of the Moon's shadow misses the Earth.

Images 
Animated path

Related eclipses

Solar eclipses of 2047–2050

References

External links 

2047 in science
2047 12 16
2047 12 16